Dhalwo is a border town in the central Galguduud region of Somalia.

References
Dhalwo

Populated places in Galguduud